Camille Gourvenec was an officer of the French external intelligence service SDECE, possibly with the rank of colonel, who, from 1966, was seconded as security adviser to President François Tombalbaye of Chad, and was therefore effectively head of Tombalbaye's security and intelligence service.  He had previously served with the French forces in Algeria.  It has been alleged that he was a key member of the Françafrique network, led by Jacques Foccart.

It was alleged that he was personally involved in the interrogation (under torture) of numerous opponents of Tombalbaye's regime, and also implicated in the killing of others, including Outel Bono.

His deputy was Commandant Pierre Galopin, who was executed in 1975 by Hissène Habré, after he had been sent to negotiate the release of Françoise Claustre.

Gourvenec also commanded Chad's Nomad and National Guard and may have had advance warning of the coup which toppled Tombalbaye in 1975 but he did not intervene. He died in 1978.

References 
 François-Xavier Verschave, La Françafrique - Le plus long scandale de la République, Stock, pages 155-172

External links 
 The killing of Outel Bono (in French)
 Chad: Fall of the Tombalbaye Government

Year of birth missing
1978 deaths
Chadian military personnel
French spies